Curveulima marshalli is a species of sea snail, a marine gastropod mollusk in the family Eulimidae. The species is one of a number within the genus Curveulima.

Description
The shell measurements range from 2.5 mm to approximately 4.9 mm.

References

External links
 To World Register of Marine Species

Eulimidae
Gastropods described in 1986